The term West Coast in Germany refers to the North Sea coast of continental Europe, including the following regions:

Denmark
Northern Jutland (Nordjylland)
Northwest Jutland (Nordvestjylland)
West Jutland (Vestjylland)
Southwest Jutland (Sydvestjylland)

Germany
North Schleswig (Nordschleswig), Germany
North Frisia (Nordfriesland) (in Southern Schleswig or Südschleswig)
Dithmarschen
Weser-Ems region
East Frisia (Ostfriesland)

Netherlands
Frisia (Dutch: Friesland, German: Westfriesland)
Groningen (Groningen)

External links 
 Die Westküste

Regions of Lower Saxony
Regions of Schleswig-Holstein